The fencing competition at the 1967 Mediterranean Games was held in Tunis, Tunisia.

Medalists

Medal table

References
1967 Mediterranean Games report at the International Committee of Mediterranean Games (CIJM) website
List of Olympians who won medals at the Mediterranean Games at Olympedia.org

M
Sports at the 1967 Mediterranean Games
1967